Mount Mingus is a mountain located in the Great Smoky Mountains National Park in the U.S. state of Tennessee. It is part of the Great Smoky Mountains subrange of the Blue Ridge Mountains, which is, in turn, part of the Appalachian Mountains.

Description

References

Mountains of Tennessee
Mountains of Great Smoky Mountains National Park
Protected areas of Sevier County, Tennessee
Mountains of Sevier County, Tennessee